Claude Deruet (1588–1660) was a famous French Baroque painter of the 17th century, from the city of Nancy.

Biography
Deruet was an apprentice to Jacques Bellange, the official court painter to Charles III, Duke of Lorraine. He was in Rome between ca. 1612 and 1619, where - according to André Félibien - he studied with the painter and etcher Antonio Tempesta. During his stay in Rome, he painted the Japanese samurai Hasekura Tsunenaga on a visit to Europe in 1615. 

Deruet was made a noble by the Duke of Lorraine in 1621, and was then made a Knight of the Order of St Michel in 1645 by Louis XIII, who had in 1641 absorbed most of Lorraine into France. He had a luxurious residence in Nancy, named La Romaine, where Louis XIII and his Queen stayed in 1633. 

Claude Lorrain was an apprentice to Claude Deruet in 1623 for one year. He also married and had two sons, one of whom became a painter.

American architect DeWitt H. Fessenden wrote a biography of Deruet, The Life and Works of Claude Deruet, in 1952.

References

See also
French Renaissance

1588 births
1660 deaths
French Baroque painters
Artists from Nancy, France